South Carolina Highway 41 may refer to:

South Carolina Highway 41, a current state highway from Mount Pleasant to northeast of Lake View
South Carolina Highway 41 (1920s), a former state highway from near Goose Creek to near Cheraw
South Carolina Highway 41 (1930s), a former state highway partially in New Zion

041 (disambiguation)